Munier Hartzenberg (born 1 August 1997) is a South African rugby union player for the  in the Currie Cup. His regular position is wing.

Hartzenberg was named in the  side for the 2022 Currie Cup Premier Division.

References

South African rugby union players
Living people
Rugby union wings
Griquas (rugby union) players
1997 births
Cheetahs (rugby union) players
Free State Cheetahs players